Schliersee is a natural lake in Upper Bavaria in the Bavarian Alps. It is located next to the small town of Schliersee in the Miesbach district.

The only island is Wörth island, located almost in the middle of the lake.

The lake is named for the monastery Kloster Schliersee ("Sliersee"), established in 779 at Kirchbichl nearby Westenhofen.

See also
List of lakes in Bavaria

External links
 

Lakes of Bavaria
Miesbach (district)
LSchliersee